The 2009–10 Tour de Ski was the 4th edition of the Tour de Ski and took place 1–10 January 2010. The race started in Oberhof, Germany, and ended in Val di Fiemme, Italy. The defending champions was Switzerland's Dario Cologna for the men and Finland's Virpi Kuitunen for the women. This year's event was won by Lukáš Bauer of the Czech Republic for the men and Poland's Justyna Kowalczyk for the women.

Final standings

Overall standings

Alyona Sidko (Russia) finished 9th but was later disqualified after she tested positive for recombinant erythropoietin (EPO).

Sprint standings

Stages

Stage 1
1 January 2010, Oberhof, Germany - prologue

Stage 2
2 January 2010, Oberhof - distance (handicap start)

Stage 3
3 January 2010, Oberhof - sprint

Defending champion  abandoned Tour de Ski after Stage 3 positioned in sixth place overall.

Stage 4
4 January 2010, Prague, Czech Republic - sprint

Twenty male athletes left Tour de Ski after stage 4, including the tour leader , fourth placed  and seventh placed . The top three finishers in the women's sprint stage did not compete in the following stage.

Stage 5
6 January 2010, Cortina d'Ampezzo – Toblach, Italy - handicap start

Stage 6
7 January 2010, Toblach - individual start

Stage 7 
9 January 2010, Val di Fiemme - mass start

Stage 8 
10 January 2010, Val di Fiemme - distance

References

External links

Tour de Ski
2009 10
January 2010 sports events in Europe
Tour de Ski 2009-10